Chinchpada is a panchayat village located in Nashik division of the Kandesh region of Maharashtra state in India. The village used to be called Bodhgaon. Administratively, Chinchpada is under Navapur Taluka, Nandurbar District, Maharashtra. There is only the single village of Chinchpada in the Chinchpada gram panchayat.
It is located on National Highway 6, running from Hazira (near Surat) in Gujarat to Kolkota, West Bengal. It is about 100 km from Dhule and about 120 km from Surat.

Infrastructure
Chinchpada is a pleasant place lined by hills on one side. 
Chinchpada is famous for the Chinchpada Christian Hospital, which is governed by the Emmanuel Hospital Association (EHA), New Delhi. The Hospital was established in 1942 as a small clinic, and later it was upgraded to a 15-bed hospital that continues to provide healthcare services to the predominantly tribal population in the surrounding villages. It was incorporated into EHA in 1974. The hospital, known for its low cost quality health care, currently has 50 beds and attracts a lot of patients referred there for surgeries, medicine, cancer treatment, palliative care, and maternity services. The hospital has a 4-bed fully equipped ICU and 24/7 quality nursing care under trained and experienced doctors.

Chinchpada is also well known for its railway station, which was constructed by the British government during the colonial era. The rail lines connect Surat to Bhusawal, two of India's big railway junctions.

Culture
The majority of the village's population is engaged in the educational services sector.
'Unity in Diversity' can seen in this town, as Marathi, Marwari, Gujarati, Adivasi, and Sikh communities live here with love and peace.

Educational Facility
Four high-schools and one Junior College provide educational facilities to the community.

Namely:
Pachim Khandesah Bhill Seva Mandal Sanchalit Vanvasi Vidyalaya' (High-school, Marathi Medium)  
S.C.Chavan Junior College. (College of Science and Arts)
Emmanuel Public School. (High-school, English Medium, Maharashtra State Board)
D.G.Agarwal Memorial School. (High-school, English Medium, CBSE Board)
Tribal Education Society. (High-school, Marathi Medium)
Sushant Sarvajanik Vachnalay Chinchpada

Demographics 
In the 2001 census, the village of Chinchpada had 6,575 inhabitants, with 3,342 males (50.8%) and 3,233 females (49.2%), for a gender ratio of 967 females per thousand males.

Notes

Villages in Nandurbar district